Béatrice Cussol (born 1970) is a French artist and writer.

She lives in Paris. Cussol teaches at the École supérieure d'art et design Le Havre-Rouen.

Cussol produces watercolors and drawings, as well as murals.

Selected writings 
 Merci, novel (éd. Balland, coll. Le Rayon, 2000)
 Pompon, novel (éd. Balland, coll. Le Rayon, 2001)
 Diane ? (éd. Léo Scheer, 2003)
 Sinon, novel (éd. Léo Scheer, 2007)
 Les Souffleuses, novel (éd. Léo Scheer, 2009)

Exhibitions 
 1994 : Béatrice Cussol, Villa Arson, Nice
 1999 : Dessins 1994–1999, Mamco, Genève
 2000 : Goldcream, Galerie Rachlin-Lemarié, Paris
 2000 : Trois millions de Joconde, Art Concept, Paris
 2008 : Duo, avec Dominique De Beir, Galerie Éric Mircher, Paris.
 2008 : Béatrice Cussol et Georgia Nelson, Galerie RDV, Nantes
 2009 : Aux petites filles modèles, collectif, Centre d'art Le LAIT
 2010 : Collection d'été, collectif, Galerie Porte Avion, Marseille
 2012 : Le nom d'une île, Maison des arts, Malakoff
 2012 : Elga Wilmer Gallery, New York
 2013 : Spritmuseum, Stockholm

References 

1970 births
Living people
French watercolourists
French novelists
French contemporary artists
Women watercolorists
21st-century French women artists
20th-century French women